Angatuba is a Brazilian municipality in the state of São Paulo. The population is 25,479 (2020 est.) in an area of 1028 km². The highway Rodovia Raposo Tavares passes south of the city.
   
There is controversy about the meaning of the name Angatuba. It is a Tupi-Guarani word for "house of spirits" or "sweet fruit". Angatuba was founded in 1872, under the name Espírito Santo da Boa Vista. It became a town (vila) and an independent municipality in 1885, when it was separated from Itapetininga. It was elevated to a city (cidade) in 1906. The name was changed to Angatuba in 1908. In 1991 Campina do Monte Alegre was separated from Angatuba.

The municipality contains the  Angatuba Ecological Station, a fully protected conservation unit created in 1985.
The ecological station is contained within the Angatuba State Forest.
This is a  sustainable use conservation unit created in 1965.

Notable people
João Francisco Benedan, vocalist and main member of Brazilian punk rock band Ratos de Porão
Suzane von Richthofen, notorious convicted murderer

References

External links
  City Hall
  House of Representatives

Municipalities in São Paulo (state)
Populated places established in 1862
1862 establishments in Brazil